Jens Stryger Larsen (born 21 February 1991) is a Danish professional footballer who plays as a defender for Super Lig club Trabzonspor and the Denmark national team.

Club career

Brøndby
Stryger Larsen made his debut for Brøndby IF starting against FC Nordsjælland in November 2009 before being replaced by Jan Kristiansen after an hour. During his time at Brøndby, he quickly became very popular among Brøndby supporters because of his energy, and in the end of the 2009–2010 season and at the beginning of the 2010–2011 season he featured regularly in Brøndby's team, keeping players such as Sweden international Alexander Farnerud on the bench. In August 2010 he was named as one of the greatest talents in Denmark by the Danish media, and at 23 September, Danish football magazine Tipsbladet reported interest in him from Serie A club Genoa.

FC Nordsjælland
On 9 July 2013, Stryger Larsen joined division rivals FC Nordsjælland on a free transfer, signing a three-year deal. He was a regular during his time in Nordsjælland, playing 30 matches in the Superliga during the 2013–14 season.

Austria Wien
On 18 June 2014, Stryger Larsen was signed by Austrian Football Bundesliga side Austria Wien on a four-year deal. He made his debut for the club on the first day of the 2014–15 season in a match against SV Grödig.

Udinese
On 24 August 2017, Stryger Larsen joined Italian Serie A club Udinese on a four-year contract. He scored his first goal for I Bianconeri on 27 September against Roma. He soon grew out to become a first team regular at Udinese.

On 19 January 2020, Stryger Larsen scored and assisted in a 3–2 loss against Milan, his goal being scored from a tight angle after a poor clearance by Milan-goalkeeper Gianluigi Donnarumma.

Trabzonspor
In June 2022, Stryger Larsen joined Trabzonspor in Turkey.

International career
Stryger Larsen was called up to the senior Denmark national team to face Liechtenstein and Armenia in August 2016. He made his debut in the friendly match against Liechtenstein on 31 August 2016, and he scored the final goal in the Danish 5–0 victory.

In June 2018 he was named in Denmark's squad for the 2018 FIFA World Cup in Russia.

In June 2021, he was included in the national team's bid for 2020 UEFA Euro, where the team reached the semi-finals.

Career statistics

Club

International

Scores and results list Denmark's goal tally first, score column indicates score after each Larsen goal.

Honours
Trabzonspor

Turkish Super Cup: 2022

References

External links

Brøndby IF profile

1991 births
Living people
Association football defenders
Danish men's footballers
Danish Superliga players
Austrian Football Bundesliga players
Serie A players
Brøndby IF players
FC Nordsjælland players
FK Austria Wien players
Udinese Calcio players
Trabzonspor footballers
Denmark under-21 international footballers
Denmark youth international footballers
Denmark international footballers
2018 FIFA World Cup players
UEFA Euro 2020 players
2022 FIFA World Cup players
Danish expatriate men's footballers
Expatriate footballers in Austria
Expatriate footballers in Italy
Expatriate footballers in Turkey
Danish expatriate sportspeople in Austria
Danish expatriate sportspeople in Italy
Danish expatriate sportspeople in Turkey
People from Lolland Municipality
Sportspeople from Region Zealand